Tolteca is a genus of Mexican cellar spiders that was first described by B. A. Huber in 2000.  it contains only two species, found only in Mexico: T. hesperia and T. jalisco.

See also
 List of Pholcidae species

References

Araneomorphae genera
Pholcidae
Spiders of Mexico